The cinnamon-breasted tody-tyrant (Hemitriccus cinnamomeipectus) is a species of bird in the family Tyrannidae. It is found in Ecuador and Peru. Its natural habitat is subtropical or tropical moist montane forests. It is threatened by habitat loss.

References

cinnamon-breasted tody-tyrant
Birds of the Ecuadorian Andes
Birds of the Peruvian Andes
cinnamon-breasted tody-tyrant
Taxonomy articles created by Polbot